Maclura tinctoria, known as old fustic and dyer's mulberry, is a medium to large tree of the Neotropics, from Mexico to Argentina. It produces a yellow dye called fustic primarily known for coloring khaki fabric for U.S. military apparel during World War I. This dye contains the flavonoid morin. It is dioecious, so both male and female plants are needed to set seed.

The leaves can be used to feed silk worms.

Old fustic is not to be confused with young fustic (Rhus cotinus) from southern Europe and Asia, which provides a more fugitive colour.

Dyeing
Fustic is a bright yellow dye that is very color-fast when used with mordants. It is frequently combined with other dyestuffs and various mordants to produce a range of yellow and greenish colors: 
 With woad or indigo: bright or Saxon greens
 With bichromate of potash: old gold
 With logwood and bichromate of potash: greenish yellows
 With copper sulfate: olive greens
 With ferrous sulfate: dark greens

References

tinctoria
Plant dyes
Plants described in 1753
Taxa named by Carl Linnaeus
Trees of Mexico
Trees of South America